The canton of Villeneuvois et Villefranchois is an administrative division of the Aveyron department, southern France. It was created at the French canton reorganisation which came into effect in March 2015. Its seat is in Villeneuve.

It consists of the following communes:
 
Ambeyrac
Brandonnet
La Capelle-Balaguier
Compolibat
Drulhe
Lanuéjouls
Maleville
Martiel
Montsalès
Ols-et-Rinhodes
Privezac
Sainte-Croix
Saint-Igest
Saint-Rémy
Salvagnac-Cajarc
Saujac
Savignac
Toulonjac
Vaureilles
Villeneuve

References

Cantons of Aveyron